Budorcas churcheri is an extinct species of takin that lived in the Pliocene of Ethiopia. Its remains were found in the Hadar Formation.

While the living takin is endemic to the region of Tibet, the presence of B. churcheri in the African continent confirms that genus was far more widespread in the past.

References

Prehistoric even-toed ungulates
Pliocene even-toed ungulates
Prehistoric bovids
Pliocene mammals of Africa
Mammals described in 1996